Lucerne District is a former Amt (administrative district) of the Canton of Lucerne, Switzerland. It had a population of 176,710 (as of 2013) and consisted of 18 municipalities, of which the city of Lucerne is the largest and the district capital.  On 1 January 2013 the Amt was divided into two Wahlkreis, Lucerne-Stadt and Lucerne-Land.

 1992/97 survey gives a total area of  without including certain large lakes, while the 2000 survey includes lakes and gives the higher value.
 Includes the area of Littau which merged into Luzern on 1 January 2010.

Mergers
On 1 January 2010 the municipality of Littau merged into the municipality of Lucerne.

References

Districts of the canton of Lucerne